Gamma Phi Delta Sorority (ΓΦΔ) is a sorority founded on February 28, 1943, by the late Elizabeth Garner, teacher and the late Violet T. Lewis, owner of Lewis Business College, Detroit, Michigan. The founders, along with the other eleven members are known as "the Sorority's 13 Original Pearls".

Each of the teachers pledged to organize a chapter of the Sorority in her home city. The next chapter to be formed was Gamma Chapter in Indianapolis, Indiana, Iva lue Lennear's hometown. As a special dispensation, the chapter was allowed to use Gamma (instead of Beta, the second letter in the Greek alphabet) as its name.

Membership
Gamma Phi Delta Sorority attracts business-women and professional women from many fields, and Chapters are located throughout the United States.

Purpose
The purpose of the organization is:
To unite fraternally for charitable, educational and fraternal purposes, and to establish and maintain active chapters throughout the United States.
To foster the improvements of the educational and vocational status of young people with special emphasis on underprivileged youth.
To assist said youth through broadening their educational objectives by encouragement, dissemination of information and financial assistance, and to promote the beneficial use of acquired education and/or training to the best interest of the community. And finally;
To create a better understanding between women of all races and creeds; promoting higher education through encouragement and financial aid; and to promote cultural enrichment and to serve mankind.

Scholarships
On the National level, four (4) scholarships and two (2) Endowments are awarded annually. The Scholarships are: The Gamma Phi Delta Merit Scholarship; the Elizabeth Garner Memorial Scholarship; the Violet T. Lewis Memorial Scholarship and the Undergraduate Scholarship. And the Endowment Funds are; The Luthermae E. Adams Endowment Fund and The Ann McElwee Perpetual Endowment Fund. In addition, our member chapters award scholarships on the local level.

Youth groups
The most satisfying and rewarding experience is the four youth groups, Rosebuds, Phi-Teens, Junior Cavaliers and Cavaliers. Youth group programs promote the continual quest for knowledge and academic excellence and it epitomizes the Sorority's aim of striving for refinement and culture. Each group is challenged to achieve their worthwhile goals through association with Gamma Phi Delta Sorority, Inc.

Charities
Gamma Phi Delta supports charities that are serving humanity and whose objectives are paralleled to its aims. Its chapter members with charities of their choice, contribute their time, expertise and finance. Gamma Phi Delta is non-political and non-sectarian. However, the sorority encourages members to participate in political actions of their choosing and welcome members of religious beliefs and a general recognition of a Supreme Being is a part of its CREED.

External links
Gamma Phi Delta National Website

Local fraternities and sororities